I picari, internationally released as The Rogues, is a 1987 Italian comedy film written and directed by Mario Monicelli. It is freely inspired by the Spanish novels Lazarillo de Tormes and Guzman de Alfarache.

The film was co-produced with Spain, where it was released as Los alegres pícaros.

Plot
I picari was the last of Monicelli's films, such as L'armata Brancaleone, to be set in the Renaissance and medieval eras.  As in his previous films, a tilting of the society and surroundings of the characters makes the film a parody of the goliardic lifestyle of the 12th or 13th century.

In 17th-century Spain, vagrants Lazarillo and Guzman meet as slaves on a ship. Both had a troubled and difficult childhood because of their parents. The first was adopted by a prostitute and a blind wanderer (Nino Manfredi) who earned a living by cheating and stealing. The second was beaten and scourged. Escaping from the ship in which they were held captive, Lazarillo and Guzman stop at a strange place where they cheat a blacksmith. Later, disguised as gentleman, they are hosted by an impoverished nobleman (Vittorio Gassman). The two tramps, who hoped to make a fortune by entering the service of a nobleman, are shocked by his poor quarters and dire living conditions. Lazarillo and Guzman then become part of a theater company, scrape together some money, buy a prostitute, and encounter a gang of criminals. One of them kills a king's guard and is sentenced to death. His friend saves him by replacing him with another prisoner.

Cast 
Giancarlo Giannini: Guzman de Alfarache
Enrico Montesano: Lazarillo de Tormes
Vittorio Gassman: Marquis Felipe de Aragona
Nino Manfredi: the blind wanderer
Giuliana De Sio:  Rosario
 Bernard Blier: the pimp
Paolo Hendel: the tutor
Vittorio Caprioli: Mozzafiato
Enzo Robutti: the Captain of the ship
Blanca Marsillach: Ponzia
Maria Casanova: Pregnant Woman
 Claudio Bisio: the leader of the mutinied rowers
 Sal Borgese: the boatswain
 Sabrina Ferilli the young prostitute

See also 
El Lazarillo de Tormes (1959)

References

External links

1987 films
Commedia all'italiana
Films directed by Mario Monicelli
Films set in the 17th century
Films set in Spain
1980s Italian-language films
Italian historical comedy films
1980s historical comedy films
Films with screenplays by Suso Cecchi d'Amico
1980s Italian films